A gubernatorial election was held on 7 April 1991 to elect the Governor of Saga Prefecture.

Candidates
Isamu Imoto - Vice-Governor of Saga Prefecture, age 65
 - later city councillor at Ogi, Saga, age 43
 - high school teacher, age 41

Results

References

Saga gubernatorial elections
1991 elections in Japan